Thero (commonly appearing in the masculine and feminine forms thera and therī respectively) is an honorific term in Pali for senior bhikkhus and bhikkhunis (Buddhist monks and nuns) in the Buddhist monastic order. The word literally means "elder". These terms, appearing at the end of a monastic's given name, are used to distinguish those who have at least 10 years since their upasampada (higher ordination). The name of an important collection of very early Buddhist poetry is called the Therigatha, "verses of the therīs".

The terms mahāthera and mahātherī (the prefix mahā meaning 'great' in both Sanskrit and Pali) are used to refer to very distinguished elderly and venerable monks and nuns considered to have reached a higher level of spiritual development.

Usage of these terms varies according to the Buddhist tradition and culture. In Sri Lanka, these terms are widely used.

Some prominent theras and therīs:
 Ananda Thera
 Rerukane Chandawimala Maha Thera
 Katukurunde Nyanananda Thera
 Narada Mahathera
 Nyanatiloka Mahathera
 Balangoda Ananda Maitreya Thero
 Mahapajapati Gotami therī
 Kiribathgoda Gnanananda Thero
 Ayya Tathaaloka Mahātherī
 Gangodawila Soma Thero
 Nyanaponika Thera
 Nanavira Thera

See also

 Ajahn
 Sayadaw
 Theravada
 Theragatha
 Therigatha

Buddhist titles
Theravada
Buddhist monasticism